Richard Stretch (26 November 1952 – 27 October 2014) was a South African cricketer. He played fourteen first-class matches for Border between 1979 and 1982.

References

External links
 

1952 births
2014 deaths
South African cricketers
Border cricketers
People from Graaff-Reinet
Cricketers from the Eastern Cape